Bhauriabhita is a village in Kamrup rural district, in the state of Assam, India, situated in south bank of river Brahmaputra.

Transport
The village is located north of National Highway 31 and connected to nearby towns and cities like Boko, Chaygaon and Guwahati with regular buses and other modes of transportation.

See also
 Bhogpur
 Barpalaha

References

Villages in Kamrup district